

Results
Arsenal's score comes first

Football League Second Division

Final League table

FA Cup

References

1902-03
English football clubs 1902–03 season